Cosmosoma ignidorsia is a moth of the family Erebidae. It was described by George Hampson in 1898. It is found in Minas Gerais, Brazil.

References

ignidorsia
Moths described in 1898